The Kangaamiut dike swarm (old spelling: Kangâmiut) is a 2.04 billion year old dike swarm located in the Qeqqata region of western Greenland. To the north it is bounded by the paleoproterozoic Ikertooq shear zone (old spelling: Ikertôq) while to the south the boundary is gradational with a gradual reduction in the density of dikes. The dike swarm was intruded during a phase of extensional tectonics. They were later deformed during the Nagssugtoqidian orogeny, with the amount of strain increasing towards the Iqertooq shear zone.

References

Dike swarms
Geology of Greenland
Kangerlussuaq